United Nations Security Council resolution 1211, adopted unanimously on 25 November 1998, after considering a report by the Secretary-General Kofi Annan regarding the United Nations Disengagement Observer Force (UNDOF), the Council extended its mandate for a further six months until 31 May 1999.

The resolution called upon the parties concerned to immediately implement Resolution 338 (1973) and requested that the Secretary-General submit a report on the situation at the end of that period.

The Secretary-General's report pursuant to the previous resolution on UNDOF said that the situation between Israel and Syria had remained calm though the situation in the Middle East as a whole remained dangerous until a settlement could be reached.

See also
 Arab–Israeli conflict
 Golan Heights
 Israel–Syria relations
 List of United Nations Security Council Resolutions 1201 to 1300 (1998–2000)

References

External links
 
Text of the Resolution at undocs.org

 1211
 1211
 1211
1998 in Israel
1998 in Syria
November 1998 events